Mikhail Iosifovich Katsnelson (born 10 August 1957) is a Dutch professor of theoretical physics of Russian descent. He works at Radboud University Nijmegen where he specializes in theoretical solid state physics and many-body quantum physics.

Early life
Katsnelson was born in Magnitogorsk, Russia. From 1972 to 1977 he attended and then graduated from the Ural State University in Sverdlovsk. In 1980 he obtained his Ph.D. from Institute of Metal Physics in the same place where his advisor was Serghey V. Vonsovsky. In 1985 he defended his thesis for his Doctor of Science degree called Strong electron correlations in transition metals, their alloys and compounds and from 1990 to 1998 became Max-Planck-Institute visiting professor.

Career
From 2004 to 2007 Katsnelson worked with many Russian and Dutch physicists on the nitrogen dioxide and discovered that its closed shell dimer  creates only weak doping which is also known as density of states in a graphene. He also discovered that density of states is ideal for chemical sensing and explained its single molecule detection. On 23 September 2007 he along with Annalisa Fasolino have proven that chemical bonding in carbon is caused by setting ripples' thermal fluctuations to 80 angstrom. In 2012 he and his colleagues have used prototype device which contained graphene heterojunctions which was combined with either thin boron nitride or molybdenum disulfide which was used as a vertical transport barrier. During the experiment, the room temperature was set from ≈50 and ≈10,000 and they prove that using such prototypes is beneficial for high-frequency operations and large-scale integrations.

Since 2014 Katsnelson is member of the Royal Netherlands Academy of Arts and Sciences.

Awards
Lenin Komsomol Prize (1988)
Spinoza Prize (2013)

References

External links

1957 births
Living people
21st-century Dutch physicists
20th-century Russian physicists
People from Magnitogorsk
Spinoza Prize winners
Theoretical physicists
Academic staff of Radboud University Nijmegen
Recipients of the Lenin Komsomol Prize
Members of the Royal Netherlands Academy of Arts and Sciences
Ural State University alumni